Cyane (from Κυανῆ (Kuanē), meaning "dark blue" in ancient Greek) was a naiad in Greek mythology who tried to prevent Hades from abducting Persephone, her playmate.

Mythology 
Cyane (sometimes anglicized as "Kyane") was a naiad, a freshwater nymph. After witnessing Hades's abduction of Persephone and trying to prevent it, Cyane was turned to liquid by Hades. In Ovid's version, she dissolved away in tears upon failing to save her friend and melted into her pool.

In the ancient Greek world the nymph represented a particular aspect of nature. Arethusa, a naiad like Kyane, is associated with a spring and pool in Syracuse (Siracusa); Kyane is said to dwell in a river bearing her name in southeastern Sicily. She had as a partner the river god Anapos (or Anapis). She cited their love as an example of consensual relationship while trying to convince Hades not to take Persephone by force.

Popular culture
In the popular TV series Xena: Warrior Princess, Cyane is a recurring name of prominent Amazon warriors, each considered the worthy successor of the former one: five different Cyanes (from different times) are shown in "Xenaverse", played respectively by Victoria Pratt as "Cyane III", Selma Blair as "Cyane I", Shelley Edwards as "Cyane IV" and Morgan Reese Fairhead as "Cyane V". "Cyane II" appears in Young Hercules series, played by Katrina Browne. There are probably some other Cyanes between "Cyane I" and "Cyane II", but they are not shown in the series. All shown Cyanes are powerful and charismatic, but "Cyane IV" is somewhat aphoristic, and "Cyane V" overly polite and shy. The first Cyane came from the future: she taught Amazons to tame horses and (in a strange time loop) gave them the name "Amazons".

A powerful person, "Cyane III" defeated both Xena (in a physical battle) and Alti (in a spiritual battle). She was trusting of Xena and even offered to let her join the tribe. Xena betrayed Cyane when Alti "offered her a better deal". Alti wanted Cyane's blood, and after she drank it she kept Cyane's soul and the souls of all the Amazons in the land of the dead. She then used their power for herself and made it evil. The souls of the Amazons were trapped in the land of the dead until the reformed Xena killed Alti and found the Amazon's new holy word, Love.

See also
List of Greek mythological figures

Notes

References 
 Diodorus Siculus, The Library of History translated by Charles Henry Oldfather. Twelve volumes. Loeb Classical Library. Cambridge, Massachusetts: Harvard University Press; London: William Heinemann, Ltd. 1989. Vol. 3. Books 4.59–8. Online version at Bill Thayer's Web Site
 Diodorus Siculus, Bibliotheca Historica. Vol 1-2. Immanel Bekker. Ludwig Dindorf. Friedrich Vogel. in aedibus B. G. Teubneri. Leipzig. 1888-1890. Greek text available at the Perseus Digital Library.
 Nonnus of Panopolis, Dionysiaca translated by William Henry Denham Rouse (1863-1950), from the Loeb Classical Library, Cambridge, MA, Harvard University Press, 1940.  Online version at the Topos Text Project.
 Nonnus of Panopolis, Dionysiaca. 3 Vols. W.H.D. Rouse. Cambridge, MA., Harvard University Press; London, William Heinemann, Ltd. 1940-1942. Greek text available at the Perseus Digital Library.
 Publius Ovidius Naso, Metamorphoses translated by Brookes More (1859-1942). Boston, Cornhill Publishing Co. 1922. Online version at the Perseus Digital Library.
 Publius Ovidius Naso, Metamorphoses. Hugo Magnus. Gotha (Germany). Friedr. Andr. Perthes. 1892. Latin text available at the Perseus Digital Library.

Metamorphoses into bodies of water in Greek mythology
Naiads
Metamorphoses characters
Nymphs